Three vessels of the United States Navy have been named USS Pasadena, after the city of Pasadena, California.

 The first  was a cargo ship in use in 1918 and 1919.
 The second  was a light cruiser in service from 1944 to 1950.
 The third  is a  nuclear attack submarine commissioned in 1989.

United States Navy ship names